Matla Setu is a bridge, built on Matla river in West Bengal. The 644 meter (2,113 ft) long bridge inaugurated by Buddhadeb Bhattacharjee, former Chief Minister of West Bengal, on Matla river in Canning town of Caning subdivision in January 2011. It is known as at Matla Bridge . It links Canning with Basanti.

Connection
The bridge is connecting Canning with the direct tourism center Jharkhali to the Sundarbans entrance. The construction of this bridge, people of Sundarbans area can easily move to Kolkata and suburban areas by road. Tourists can quickly come to the Sundarbans. As a result, economic development of the area has taken place.

See also
 List of longest bridges in West Bengal

References 

Bridges in West Bengal